John James "Jack" McGlynn (February 26, 1922 – August 20, 2016) was an American politician who served as mayor of Medford, Massachusetts, and as a member of the Massachusetts House of Representatives.

Early life
McGlynn was born on February 26, 1922, in Cambridge, Massachusetts, to Anthony and Catherine (McCormack) McGlynn. He graduated from St. Clement High School in 1939. In 1942 he married Helen Lenox.

Military career
During World War II, McGlynn was a member of the 23rd Headquarters Special Troops, a tactical deception unit known as the "Ghost Army" that worked to mislead the Germans about the size and location of American troops. He earned four combat stars during the war.

Political career
McGlynn began his political career in 1954 as a candidate for city council in Medford. He served on city council for a total of 22 years. He was also the city's mayor from 1962 to 1967, 1970 to 1971, and 1976 to 1977. At the time, the position of mayor was a ceremonial one, as an appointed city manager served as the chief administrator of the city. From 1959 to 1975, McGlynn also served as a state representative. In 1966 he was an unsuccessful candidate for Lieutenant Governor of Massachusetts. During the 1980s McGlynn was the chief secretary to Governor Edward J. King. From 1983 to 1997 he was the commissioner of the Massachusetts Public Employee Retirement Administration.

Personal life
Outside of politics, McGlynn worked as a realtor and owned a floral shop for several years after the war. For 42 years, McGlynn was also chairman of Medford Cooperative Bank and its successor, Brookline Bank.

His son, Michael J. McGlynn, served as mayor of Medford from 1988 to 2016. The younger McGlynn was the first mayor elected under the strong mayor form of government.

Medford's John J. McGlynn Sr. Elementary School is named after McGlynn.

Death
McGlynn died on August 20, 2016, at his home in Medford. On August 25 and 26 he lay in repose at Medford City Hall. McGlynn was the first person in modern history to receive this honor.

References

1922 births
2016 deaths
United States Army personnel of World War II
American real estate brokers
Mayors of Medford, Massachusetts
Democratic Party members of the Massachusetts House of Representatives
New England Law Boston alumni
Northeastern University alumni
Suffolk University alumni
Florists
Businesspeople from Massachusetts
20th-century American businesspeople